The 1988–89 season was the 87th season in which Dundee competed at a Scottish national level, playing in the Scottish Premier Division. Dundee would finish in 8th place. Dundee would also compete in both the Scottish League Cup and the Scottish Cup, where they were knocked out by Rangers in the quarter-finals of the League Cup, and by inter-city rivals Dundee United in the 3rd round of the Scottish Cup.

Scottish Premier Division 

Statistics provided by Dee Archive.

League table

Scottish League Cup 

Statistics provided by Dee Archive.

Scottish Cup 

Statistics provided by Dee Archive.

Player statistics 
Statistics provided by Dee Archive

|}

See also 

 List of Dundee F.C. seasons

References

External links 

 1988–89 Dundee season on Fitbastats

Dundee F.C. seasons
Dundee